Night Flight Plus is a video-on-demand service offering original episodes of the 1980s USA Network TV show Night Flight. In addition to archived episodes of the show, the service features films in the music documentary, concert, horror and cult genres. The channel is currently available on Roku, Amazon Fire TV, Apple TV, Chromecast and online at their website. The site launched with subscriptions offered at $4.99 a month and $39.99 a year. Describing the launch of the channel, Stuart Shapiro told The A.V. Club, “Our goal with Night Flight PLUS is to resurrect the editorial spirit of Night Flight with the same original curatorial edge we had in the ’80s for a new digital generation.”

References

External links 
 

Internet television channels
Video on demand services
1980s in American television
Internet properties established in 2016